Thomas William Flockett (17 July 1927 – 12 July 1997) was an English footballer who played for Spennymoor United, Chesterfield and Bradford City.

He served as Bradford City's captain from the 1955–56 season, until at least the 1960–61 season.

Sources

References

1927 births
1997 deaths
People from Ferryhill
Footballers from County Durham
English footballers
Association football fullbacks
Spennymoor United F.C. players
Chesterfield F.C. players
Bradford City A.F.C. players
English Football League players